Gerard Gruisen (born 4 February 1935) is a Dutch footballer. He played in three matches for the Netherlands national football team from 1953 to 1954.

References

External links
 

1935 births
Living people
Dutch footballers
Netherlands international footballers
Place of birth missing (living people)
Association footballers not categorized by position